2011 Gainare Tottori season.

J2 League
2011 J.League

League table

Matches

References

External links
 J.League official site

Gainare Tottori
Gainare Tottori seasons